Goddess is the eleventh studio album by Emm Gryner, released in February 2009 on Dead Daisy Records in Canada and Second Motion Records in the United States.

Track listing
 "Let it Snow"
 "Goddess"
 "Young As the Night"
 "Empty Hole"
 "Die Evergreen"
 "Skating Rink"
 "Match"
 "Killing Spree"
 "Leftover Love"
 "Note 2 Self"

2009 albums
Emm Gryner albums